Țibănești is a commune in Iași County, Western Moldavia, Romania. It is composed of eight villages: Glodenii Gândului, Griești, Jigoreni, Răsboieni, Recea, Țibănești, Tungujei and Vălenii.

References

Communes in Iași County
Localities in Western Moldavia